The 2015 South American Artistic Gymnastics Championships were held in Cali, Colombia June 18–22, 2015. The competition was organized by the Colombian Gymnastics Federation and approved by the International Gymnastics Federation. This was the 14th edition of the South American Artistic Gymnastics Championships for senior gymnasts.

Participating nations

Medalists

Medal table

References

2015 in gymnastics
South American Gymnastics Championships
International gymnastics competitions hosted by Colombia
2015 in Colombian sport